Sphinctour is a live CD/DVD/VHS release by the industrial metal band Ministry released in 2002. It contains various tracks recorded on their 1996 world tour in support of the album Filth Pig. The album title is a play on the word sphincter.

Track listing

Track 5 and 13 not included on CD releases

Album release
The original objective of Sphinctour was as a home video release, though a CD version was also made. There are no discernible differences audio-wise from the DVD, although, like their In Case You Didn't Feel Like Showing Up release, two tracks were omitted from the CD release. In addition, the DVD features the song "Happy Dust" as the intro and outro. The live video is edited as jump cut, which is a combination of all the concerts that took place in America and Europe.

Personnel

Ministry
 Al Jourgensen - vocals, mandolin ("Reload"), harmonica ("Filth Pig"),  guitar ("Just One Fix", "N.W.O."), production
 Paul Barker - bass guitar, keyboard bass ("The Fall"), production
 Rey Washam - drums
 Louis Svitek - guitar
 Duane Buford - keyboards
 Zlatko Hukic - guitar

Additional personnel
 Tom Baker - mastering
 Paul Elledge - image and design

Video personnel
 Jeffrey Kinart - television director, production, editor
 Doug Freel - director, editor
 Tom Tuntlend - assistant editor
 Todd Darling - post-production supervisor

References

2002 live albums
2002 video albums
Live video albums
Ministry (band) albums
Sanctuary Records live albums
Sanctuary Records video albums
Albums produced by Al Jourgensen